Meysam Teymouri (: born July 6 1992) is an Iranian footballer playing for Mes Rafsanjan in the Persian Gulf Pro League.

Club career

Esteghlal 
Meysam Teymouri joined Esteghlal team in the summer of 1397 with the signing of a three-year contract by Seyed Pendar Tawfiqi, in charge of transfers.

Tractor

He joined the Azerbaijan Tractor Football Club in the summer of 2019.

He played in the National Cup in the final match between Tractor Azerbaijan and Esteghlal Tehran in the National Cup 1398-99; He bravely put his head in front of the opponent's shot and saved Traktor's goal and the team's championship.

Career statistics

Honours
Tractor
Hazfi Cup (1): 2019–20

References 

 Esteghlal VS. Machin Sazi Soccerway. Retrieved 17 April 2019.
 Pars Jam Buseher VS. Esteghlal   Soccerway. Retrieved 15 April 2017.
 Tractor VS. Perspolis Soccerway. Retrieved 30 August  2019.
رسمی; تیموری به استقلال پیوست www.varzesh3.com  (in Persian).
بیوگرافی میثم تیموری، مدافع چپ باشگاه تراکتور (in Persian).
نقل و انتقالات تراکتور/ مدافع استقلال به جمع شاگردان دنیزلی پیوست www.medal1.com (in Persian).

External links 

 Meysam Teymouri at PersianLeague.com
 Meysam Teymouri at metafootball.com
 Meysam Teymouri at Soccerway
 Meysam Teymouri on Instagram

1992 births
Living people
Nassaji Mazandaran players
Pars Jonoubi Jam players
Esteghlal F.C. players
Association football forwards
Iranian footballers
People from Savadkuh
Sportspeople from Mazandaran province